The Tacony Music Hall is a historic building in the Tacony neighborhood of Philadelphia, Pennsylvania.

The three-story brick building was erected in 1885 by Frank W. Jordan, a local druggist and entrepreneur, as a multi-use facility, with retail shop space on the first floor, an auditorium on the second, and space for the Keystone Scientific and Literary Association (founded 1876, later called the Disston Library and Free Reading Room) on the third.

P. T. Barnum and Susan B. Anthony lectured here.

The building was listed on the National Register of Historic Places in 1990.

In March 2017 the building owners and operators began the process of opening a sex positive community center.  Membership is limited to those over 18 years of age who may pay a membership or event fee and may sign a membership form or liability waiver.  The second and third floors are used by this organization which is called Philly Music Hall LLC. They rejected the label of "sex club". Nevertheless, a spokesperson recognizes that "occasionally there will be people who have sex." Programming includes workshops, events, and community meetups to discuss and practice various forms of alternative sexuality. Participants are encouraged to practice active consent and safe sex, with failure to do so resulting in suspension or revocation of membership.

The center permanently closed in August 2020 as a result of the COVID-19 pandemic.

References

External links
 https://www.inquirer.com/news/tacony-music-hall-sex-positive-club-hinchey-civic-association-henon-fraternal-organization-20181219.html

 

Listing and photograph at Philadelphia Architects and Buildings
Woodcut (1893) at Bryn Mawr College

Historic American Buildings Survey in Philadelphia
Theatres on the National Register of Historic Places in Philadelphia
Northeast Philadelphia